2.Pan Arab Games

Beirut, Lebanon

October 12–27, 1957 
Finals (winners first)

Bronze Medal Winners

References 

Boxing at the Pan Arab Games